The 1919 Childers Classical Institute football team was an American football team that represented Childers Classical Institute—now known as the Abilene Christian University—as an independent during the 1919 college football season. It was the school first year fielding a football team. Led by Vernon McCasland in his first and only season as head coach, the team compiled a record of 2–2.

Schedule

References

Childers Classical Institute
Abilene Christian Wildcats football seasons
Childers Classical Institute football